Crabtree Creek is a tributary of the South Santiam River in Linn County in the U.S. state of Oregon. It begins in the western foothills of the Cascade Range at Crabtree Mountain near Crabtree Lake.

The unincorporated community of Lacomb lies south of the creek, along one of its tributaries slightly west of the Cascade foothills.

Bridges
In addition to the Route 226 bridge, the creek flows under two covered bridges.

Recreation
Covering , it has picnic tables, river views, a footbridge, a waterwheel that formerly powered a mill at the site, as well as places to fish and swim. Ripley's Believe It or Not! once listed the confluence as the only one in the world where a stream named "river" emptied into a stream named "creek". This was, however, incorrect. Fall River is a tributary of Clear Creek in Colorado.

Fishing for wild cutthroat trout in the creek is permitted on a catch-and-release basis; fishing for steelhead is not allowed. The creek is not stocked with hatchery fish.

Whitewater enthusiasts sometimes run parts of Crabtree Creek in kayaks or other craft. A  run from the North Fork Bridge to Larwood Park, is rated class 3T or 4 (intermediate or advanced) on the International Scale of River Difficulty. The  run below that is less difficult. Hazards include rocks, logs, overhanging limbs, and a dangerous barbed-wire fence across most of the river a few miles downstream of the Route 226 bridge.

Tributaries
Named tributaries from source to mouth are Bonnie, White Rock, Dorgan, South Fork Crabtree, and Bald Peter creeks, all from the left; Rock Creek from the right; Green Mountain Creek from the left; Hunter and Church creeks, Roaring River, all from the right, and Beaver Creek, from the left.

See also
List of covered bridges in Oregon
List of rivers of Oregon

References

Rivers of Linn County, Oregon
Rivers of Oregon